August Brömse  (2 September 1873, in Františkovy Lázně – 7 November 1925, in Prague) was a Bohemian German etcher and painter.

Life and work 
He was the son of Karl Johann Brömse, a decorative painter from Rostock. After an apprenticeship in his father's workshop, he received lessons at a private school in Berlin, operated by Adolf Schlabitz.  From 1892, he attended the Academy of Arts, where he studied with Woldemar Friedrich, Christian Ludwig Bokelmann, and the animal painter, Paul Friedrich Meyerheim. He also took courses in anatomy from Rudolf Virchow. His artistic education was completed with private classes in etching and engraving, taught by Louis Jacoby. 

After that, he returned home and worked as a freelance artist. It was there, from 1902 to 1903, that he created his first large etching cycle, "Death and the Maiden", in fourteen sheets. It was awarded a gold medal in 1906, at an exhibition in the Palais du Travail, in Paris. The etchings were eventually acquired by the Kupferstichkabinett Berlin. 

Encouraged by his success in Paris, he moved to Prague, where he once again started as a freelance artist. From 1906 to 1908, he worked on another cycle, of ten sheets, called "Das ganze Sein ist flammend Leid" (roughly; The Whole of Existence is Fiery Suffering/Sorrow). In 1907, he began to work with colored etchings; converting his first cycle into that format. In his later years, he created paintings from a type of paint that he made himself.

He was married in 1910, to Else Schünemann and they had one son. That same year, he was named a full member of the "Society for the Advancement of Science and Art" and appointed a Professor at the Academy of Fine Arts. His best known student there was Mikuláš Galanda. He was also a member of the "Union of German Artists in Bohemia". 

He died of tuberculosis in 1925.

Sources 
 "Brömse, August". In: Ulrich Thieme (Ed.): Allgemeines Lexikon der Bildenden Künstler von der Antike bis zur Gegenwart, Vol.5: Brewer–Carlingen. E. A. Seemann, Leipzig 1911, pg.49 (Online)
 "Brömse, August". In: Hans Vollmer (Ed.): Allgemeines Lexikon der bildenden Künstler des XX. Jahrhunderts, Vol.1: A–D. E. A. Seemann, Leipzig 1953, pg.321

External links 

 
 Brief biography @ the Egerländer Kunstgalerie Marktredwitz

1873 births
1925 deaths

German Bohemian people
Academic staff of the Academy of Fine Arts, Prague
People from Františkovy Lázně
Austro-Hungarian expatriates in Germany
Tuberculosis deaths in Czechoslovakia
Czechoslovak painters
Czechoslovak etchers
Austro-Hungarian painters
Etchers from the Austro-Hungarian Empire